The Maharashtra State Assembly election, 1990 was held in Maharashtra, India in 1990, to elect 288 members of the Maharashtra Legislative Assembly.

Results

List of Political Parties participated in 1990 Maharashtra Assembly Elections.

Indian National Congress won the most number of seats. And Sharad Pawar was sworn in as the 7th Chief minister of Maharashtra.

Summary of results of the Maharashtra State Assembly election, 1990

Region-wise Breakup

District-wise Results

Analysis 
According to journalist Makarand Gadgil, 1990 election was a "watershed election in Maharashtra’s politics". Because, the right-wing BJP and Shiv Sena emerged as the major opposition for the first time winning 94 seats. Whereas until 1990 election, various left-wing parties like the Peasants and Workers Party, Indian National Congress (Socialist), Janata Party, Janata Dal, Republican Party of India, Communist Party of India and Communist Party of India (Marxist) were the main opposition. These parties won 38 seats in the 1990 election. They won only 8 seats in the 2009 Assembly election showing that their decline has continued.

Elected members

References

State Assembly elections in Maharashtra
1990s in Maharashtra
Maharashtra